Spinepeira is a genus of South American orb-weaver spiders containing the single species, Spinepeira schlingeri. It was first described by Herbert Walter Levi in 1995, and has only been found in Peru.

References

Araneidae
Monotypic Araneomorphae genera
Spiders of South America